The Archdeacon of Winchester is a senior ecclesiastical officer within the Diocese of Winchester.

History
Originally created as the archdeaconry of Basingstoke on 26 July 1927 within the Diocese of Winchester and from the old Archdeaconry of Winchester, the office replaced that of Archdeacon of Surrey, which had been newly transferred to the Diocese of Guildford. The Basingstoke archdeaconry was renamed to Winchester in 2000, the ancient Archdeaconry of Winchester having been renamed to Bournemouth.

As archdeacon, he is responsible for the disciplinary supervision of the clergy within the archdeaconry, which (on its creation) consisted of six rural deaneries in the northern part of the diocese: Aldershot, Alton, Andover, Basingstoke, Kingsclere and Silchester. Since a pastoral reorganisation in 2000, the diocese now consists of the new archdeaconry of Winchester (the north) and the archdeaconry of Bournemouth (the south).

List of archdeacons
Archdeacons of Basingstoke
 1927–1947 (ret.): John Turner
 1948–2 April 1958 (d.): Anthony Chute
 1958–1971 (ret.): Richard Rudgard (afterwards archdeacon emeritus)
 1971–1982 (res.): Geoffrey Finch (afterwards archdeacon emeritus)
 1982–1990 (ret.): Trevor Nash (afterwards archdeacon emeritus)
 1990–1998 (res.): Alec Knight
 1999–2000: John Guille (became Archdeacon of Winchester)
In 2000, the archdeaconry was renamed Winchester.
Archdeacons of Winchester
2000–2007 (res.): John Guille (previously Archdeacon of Basingstoke)
23 April 2009 – 30 November 2015 (ret.): Michael Harley
21 February 2016–present: Richard Brand (also Archdeacon of Bournemouth since 2021, in plurality)

References

Anglican ecclesiastical offices
 
 
Lists of Anglicans
Lists of English people